Dirtie Blonde was a rock band that consisted of vocalist Amie Miriello, acoustic guitarist Jay Dmuchowski, lead guitarist Sean Kipe, bassist Dean Moore and drummer Tim Perez. The band released the hit single "Walk Over Me" from their self-titled album in the spring of 2006 on the Jive Records label. Dirtie Blonde toured the U.S. throughout 2006, opening for artists such as Nick Lachey, INXS and Teddy Geiger.

Miriello now performs under her own name; a second album for Jive was reportedly close to completion as of early 2008. Sean Kipe now plays lead guitar for the rock band Course of Nature.

Ensemble 
Amie Miriello - Vocals
Jay Dmuchowski - Guitar
Sean Kipe - Guitar
Dean Moore - Bass
Tim Perez - Drums

External links 
Amie Miriello on MySpace
Course of Nature on MySpace

Jive Records artists
Musical groups established in 2005
Musical groups disestablished in 2007
American rock music groups